In mathematics, tautness is a rigidity property of foliations. A taut foliation is a codimension 1 foliation of a closed manifold with the property that every leaf meets a transverse circle. By transverse circle, is meant a closed loop that is always transverse to the tangent field of the foliation.

If the foliated manifold has non-empty tangential boundary, then a codimension 1 foliation is taut if every leaf meets a transverse circle or a transverse arc with endpoints on the tangential boundary. Equivalently, by a result of Dennis Sullivan, a codimension 1 foliation is taut if there exists a Riemannian metric that makes each leaf a minimal surface. Furthermore, for compact manifolds the existence, for every leaf , of a transverse circle meeting , implies the existence of a single transverse circle meeting every leaf. 

Taut foliations were brought to prominence by the work of William Thurston and David Gabai.

Relation to Reebless foliations
Taut foliations are closely related to the concept of Reebless foliation.  A taut foliation cannot have a Reeb component, since the component would act like a "dead-end" from which a transverse curve could never escape; consequently, the boundary torus of the Reeb component has no transverse circle puncturing it.  A Reebless foliation can fail to be taut but the only leaves of the foliation with no puncturing transverse circle must be compact, and in particular, homeomorphic to a torus.

Properties
The existence of a taut foliation implies various useful properties about a closed 3-manifold.

Rummler–Sullivan theorem
By a theorem of Hansklaus Rummler and Dennis Sullivan, the following conditions are equivalent for transversely orientable codimension one foliations  of closed, orientable, smooth manifolds M:
 is taut;

References

Foliations